Scranton Township is a township in Greene County, Iowa, USA.

History
Scranton Township was established in 1870.

References

Townships in Greene County, Iowa
Townships in Iowa
1870 establishments in Iowa
Populated places established in 1870